On a Sad Sunny Day is the debut album by Arctic Plateau released in 2009 by Prophecy Productions. The artwork was done by Fursy Teyssier from Les Discrets.

Track listing

Personnel
 Gianluca Divirgilio - Music, lyrics
 Fursy Teyssier - artwork

References

2009 debut albums
Arctic Plateau albums